The Gold Star Wives of America (Gold Star Spouses) (GSW) is a private nonprofit organization formed before the end of World War II to provide support for the spouses and children of those who lost their lives while serving in the Armed Forces of the United States.

History 

In March 1929, the Congress passed a law to offer financial compensations to mothers and wives of soldiers killed on the field. From 1930 to 1933, the government paid for more than 6,000 Gold Star mothers and wives to go to Europe to pray onsite for their lost ones.

The first meeting took place on April 5, 1945, when four young widows met in Marie Jordan's apartment on West 20th Street in New York City. One week later, President Franklin D. Roosevelt died, and shortly thereafter, Eleanor Roosevelt joined the organization. Mrs. Roosevelt attended meetings, wrote about the organization in her My Day column, entertained children of Gold Star Wives at a picnic at her home in Hyde Park, New York, served on the first board of directors, and was one of the original 15 signers when the organization was chartered as a non-profit organization in the State of New York in December 1945. The group holds a congressional charter under Title 36 of the United States Code under Public Law 96-497.

From the outset, the organization sponsored a variety of activities for the children, and guided them as they formed their own auxiliary of the organization called the Gold Star Sons and Daughters.

Gold Star Wives groups were soon organized in other cities throughout the country, and were chartered as chapters of the Gold Star Wives of America, Inc.s The Korean War, Vietnam, the Gulf War, Afghanistan and Iraq brought in new groups of widows (widowers). Added to the survivors of service personnel killed in action are thousands who die each year from service-connected causes. Remarried widows are eligible for membership.

In 1980, the organization received its federal charter from Congress.

In 1947, the US Congress established the Gold Star label pin presented to spouses and families of service officers killed in combat.

A senate resolution created the Gold Star Wives Day, which was first celebrated on December 18th 2010.

Description 

There are members and local chapters throughout the United States. The country is divided into eight regions. Region conferences are held in the spring where recommendations originate for presentation to the national convention held each year, usually in July.

An Appreciation Award Reception is held in Washington, D.C. in late May honoring those who have shown that they have gratefully remembered those who gave their lives in the service of our country, and their survivors.

See also 
 Blue Star Mothers Club
 Gold Star Fathers Act of 2014
 Gold Star Lapel Button
 Gold Star Mothers Club
 Service flag
 Yellow ribbon

References

External links

Gold Star Wives of America official website
Federal Charter to Gold Star Wives of America, S. 1179 [microform] : hearing before the Committee on the Judiciary, United States Senate, Ninety-sixth Congress, first session, on S. 1179, November 16, 1979. 
Gold Star Wives: hearing before the Subcommittee on Administrative Law and Governmental Relations of the Committee on the Judiciary, House of Representatives, Ninety-sixth Congress, second session, on H.R. 154 ... June 16, 1980.

1945 establishments in the United States
Organizations established in 1945
Patriotic and national organizations chartered by the United States Congress
United States military support organizations
World War II non-governmental organizations